GMERS Medical College and Hospital, Gotri is a medical college situated in Vadodara, Gujarat. It was established in the year 2011. The college imparts the degree Bachelor of Medicine and Surgery (MBBS). Nursing and para-medical courses are also offered. The college is affiliated to Maharaja Sayajirao University of Baroda and is recognized by Medical Council of India. The hospital associated with the college is one of the largest hospitals in the Vadodara. The selection to the college is done on the basis of merit through National Eligibility and Entrance Test. Yearly undergraduate student intake was 150 earlier but now it has been increased to 200.

Courses
GMERS Medical College and Hospital, Gotri undertakes education and training of students MBBS courses. This college is offering 200 MBBS seats from 2019 of which 85% Seats are of state quota and 15% is for Nation Counselling.

References

External links 

2011 establishments in Gujarat
Educational institutions established in 2011
Medical colleges in Gujarat